The A433 road  is an A road and primary route in Gloucestershire, England.

Route

Fosse Way
The last  follow the route of the Fosse Way. In this section the road passes the Thames Head pub (named for the source of the Thames) before rising over a crest and descending into a steep-side cutting to pass under the Golden Valley Line, through a narrow bridge which has no pavement for pedestrians.

History 
When the route was first designated in 1922, it finished at a junction with the A429 on the Fosse Way just west of Kemble near Jackaments Bottom. When RAF Kemble was built, circa 1937, the A429 was diverted south of the airfield to follow an upgraded existing road through Kemble village, and the section of the A429 north of the airfield became a continuation of the A433.

In the 1930s or 1940s the route was extended from Cirencester to the A40 just west of Burford, on the former route of the B4425.  In the 1980s this section was downgraded to become the B4425 again.

References 

Roads in England
Transport in Gloucestershire